Idris Morgan Hopkins (11 October 1910 – 9 October 1994) was a Welsh footballer famed for his talented right foot. He played for many clubs throughout his career, but most famously Brentford where he captained them in the English First Division. He is a member of the Brentford Hall of Fame.

Early life

Hopkins was born in the mining town of Merthyr Tydfil in Wales, son of a coal miner. He was naturally right footed but spent a great deal of time improving his weaker left foot repeatedly kicking a ball against a wall until it was of equal standard. Before turning professional he played football at an amateur level for Gellyfaelog and New Road.

Professional football career

Hopkins' first taste of professional football came with spells at Football League sides Merthyr Town and Sheffield Wednesday in 1927 and 1929 respectively. He failed to make a league appearance for either side before dropping back into non-league football with Dartford and Ramsgate Press Wanderers. He moved on to Crystal Palace in 1932 where he played 4 games before being transferred to Brentford.

It was at Brentford where he established himself as a footballer as part of their greatest ever team. He wore the number 7 shirt and was an old fashioned inside forward with two good feet and a determined attitude. Between 1932 and 1947 and he made 314 official appearances, scoring 77 goals and added over 200 appearances and 49 goals during the Second World War.

In 1946 Brentford, in Division 1, and with Hopkins as club captain were relegated to Division 2. During that season he made 43 appearances and scored four goals. This season was the last that Brentford were in the top flight of English football until they won promotion in 2021.

In May 1947 he left Brentford and signed for Bristol City where he played 27 times before retiring in 1948 at the age of 40.

He also made two appearances for West Ham United as a guest player during World War II.

His weekly wage was £12, the maximum permitted under league rules. Equivalent to £330 a week in 2007 terms, it was significantly lower than the wages of modern international footballers. He was inducted into the Brentford Hall of Fame in 1989.

International career

Hopkins was capped 12 times for Wales playing in the British Home Championships between 1934 and 1939, and undoubtedly would have won more if it hadn't been for World War II. He also made 9 appearances for Wales in wartime internationals scoring once.

During his international career he played against such greats as Cliff Bastin, Stanley Matthews and Tommy Lawton. Perhaps the most notable match he appeared in was Wales 4–2 victory over England in 1938 at Ninian Park as part of the 1939 British Home Championship. Idris was amongst the scorers for Wales with Stanley Matthews and Tommy Lawton netting for England.

Honours

As a player 
Brentford
Football League Second Division Championship: 1934–35
Football League Third Division Championship: 1932-33
 London War Cup Winner: 1941-42

As an individual 
 Brentford Hall of Fame

Non-playing Career and Retirement
After football Hopkins had spells coaching in Sweden with IFK Norrkoping and FK Slepnier, and Turkey with Demirspor F.C. He also managed Ramsgate, Portadown and Sutton United. He eventually moved to Middlesex where he owned and ran a confectionery shop Kandies in Harefield during the 1960’s and 70’s before settling in Buckinghamshire with his wife, Nancy, and sons Barry and Ashley.

Hopkins died in on 9 October 1994 two days before his 84th birthday. A minutes' silence was held as a mark of respect before Brentford's match on the following Saturday.

External links
Some photos of Idris's International Caps and some old Brentford Photos
Details of Englands home internationals, many against Wales and Idris
The British Home International Tournament
A history of Welsh international football matches
His career at Crystal Palace

His comments to a passer by on the bus

References

1910 births
1994 deaths
Brentford F.C. players
Sheffield Wednesday F.C. players
Crystal Palace F.C. players
Bristol City F.C. players
Wales international footballers
Wales wartime international footballers
Footballers from Merthyr Tydfil
Welsh footballers
West Ham United F.C. wartime guest players
Dartford F.C. players
Southern Football League players
Merthyr Town F.C. players
Association football outside forwards